Beer for My Horses is a 2008 American comedy film starring and co-produced by country music entertainer Toby Keith which is based on his song by the same name. The film was co-written by Keith and Rodney Carrington (who also stars in the film) and directed by Michael Salomon, who has directed numerous music videos for Keith.

The film was shot in and around Las Vegas, New Mexico, United States and was released on August 8, 2008. It made about $667,000 in its limited box office release.

Plot
Best friends Joe Bill "Rack" Racklin (Toby Keith) and Lonnie Freeman (Rodney Carrington) are deputy sheriffs in the small town of Mangum, Oklahoma who enjoy pig hunting and drinking at the local bar, the Thirsty Monkey.

After his girlfriend Cammie (Gina Gershon) leaves him when he does not make time for her due to his job and hanging out with friends, Rack finds out that his old flame Annie Streets (Claire Forlani) has returned home from Chicago to care for her sick mother. Rack, Lonnie, and their friend and fellow deputy Skunk Tarver (Ted Nugent) arrest three local criminals and a Mexican drug lord, Tito Garza (Greg Serano), for stealing fertilizer that is intended to make methamphetamine. Garza is scheduled to be turned over to the FBI for federal charges when Annie mysteriously disappears after a date with Rack, who discovers that Annie has been kidnapped by Tito's older brother, Manuel Garza (Carlos Sanz), who runs a large Mexican drug cartel. Manuel contacts the police and demands Tito be returned to him in Santa Luna, Mexico, or he will kill Annie.

Despite being taken off the case by their boss, Sheriff Landry (Tom Skerritt), Rack, Lonnie, and Skunk break Tito out of his jail cell and take him to Mexico. Along the way, they approach a young hooker named Harveyetta and are helped by a group of circus entertainers led by Charlie (Willie Nelson), who gives them a jug of homemade whiskey known as "circus jolly".

Once in Mexico after dropping Harveyetta off, they engage in a gunfight with Garza's men and it is revealed that Annie's rich and powerful stepfather, Buck Baker (Barry Corbin) is Garza's partner and his United Farm Enterprises is the base for the largest methamphetamine operation in Oklahoma. Baker reveals that the local district attorney, Levin (Curtis Armstrong), is corrupt and that he has been giving Annie's mother "goofy juice" to make her appear to have Alzheimer's disease.

With the help of former criminal Johnny Franks, who becomes undercover FBI agent Levon Spurlock, Rack kills Buck and rescues Annie. Rack, Lonnie, and Skunk turn Manuel and Tito over to the FBI in Oklahoma City and return to Mangum. There they are cheered by the local crows at the Thirsty Monkey. Landry berates them for disobeying orders, but does not arrest them and everyone toasts "whiskey for my men, beer for my horses" while serving "circus jolly".

Cast
 Toby Keith as Joe Bill "Rack" Racklin
 Rodney Carrington as Lonnie Luther Freeman
 Ted Nugent as Skunk Tarver
 Barry Corbin as Buck Baker
 Greg Serano as Tito Garza
 Carlos Sanz as Manuel Garza
 Claire Forlani as Annie Streets 
 Curtis Armstrong as D.A. Levin 
 Tom Skerritt as Sheriff Wilson Landry
 Willie Nelson as Charlie
 Chris Browning as Deputy Stippens
 Mac Davis as Reverend J.D. Parker
 Keith Jardine as Jay Boy Simpson
 Gina Gershon as Cammie
 David Allan Coe as Gypsy
 Mel Tillis as Bob the plumber
 Cledus T. Judd as Doughnut Shop employee

Box office
The film made $800,000 in its limited domestic release, with a possible worldwide gross of $1,500,000.

The film is available on DVD and Blu-Ray, and has made $27.5 million in DVD sales, and $14 million in Blu-Ray, for a total of $42.5 million in home video sales.

Reception

Box office
The film was released to 450 theaters in 2008, and made $235,000 in its opening weekend, and stayed in theaters for four weeks, it made a total of $895,000.

Critical reception
The film holds a rating of 0% on Rotten Tomatoes based on 11 critics. Toby Keith was criticized for his performance, though Willie Nelson was praised.

Soundtrack

References

External links

Beer for My Horses at CMT.com

2008 films
2008 comedy films
American comedy films
Country music films
2000s English-language films
Films shot in New Mexico
Neo-Western films
American vigilante films
Roadside Attractions films
2000s vigilante films
2000s American films